Palpicrassus is a genus of beetles in the family Cerambycidae, containing the following species:

 Palpicrassus inexpectatus Martins & Galileo, 2010
 Palpicrassus paulistanus Galileo & Martins, 2007

References

Apomecynini